Donje is a village in the Haveli taluka of Pune district in Maharashtra State, India. Tanaji Malusare Path (Sinhagad Road), which starts at Sarasbaug junction, terminates at Sinhagad Fort or Paitha at Donje village. It is at a distance of 30 km from Pune city and 5 km from Khadakwasla Dam.

References 

Villages in Pune district